Everest George "E. G." Sewell ( September 17, 1874 – April 2, 1940) was a former Mayor of Miami.

E. G. and his brother, John Sewell moved to Miami on March 3, 1896, and opened the first store north of the Miami River on March 26, 1896. 

In February 1916, he was elected as president of Miami Chamber of Commerce and was re-elected every year until 1925 (except for 1919). He was elected as Mayor of Miami in 1927 (until 1929), 1933 (until 1935), 1939 (in recall election for 2 months), and lastly 1939 (until his death in 1940).  Under his leadership the chamber of commerce published,  The Miamian , a monthly newspaper dedicated to promoting the city abroad.

He died two days after suffering a heart attack on April 2, 1940, at Jackson Memorial Hospital.

There is a city of Miami nature park named after him: E. G. Sewell Park located at 1801 NW South River Drive.

References
Notes

Bibliography

 Hollingsworth, Tracy. History of Dade County Florida. (Miami): (self published), 1936.
 The Miami News; Sewell Foresaw Pan-American Tie by Howard Kleinberg; February 2, 1985.
 The Miami Daily News; Sewell Tells of City's Early Attempts to gain Recognition by Sylvia Leibovit; April 13, 1933.
 Daytona Beach Morning Journal; Death after Heart Attack; April 2, 1940.

1875 births
1940 deaths
Mayors of Miami